Pattaya is a city in Thailand. Pattaya is a self-governing municipal area which covers Tambon's Nong Prue and Na Klua and parts of Huai Yai and Nong Pla Lai. The city is in the industrial Eastern Seaboard zone, along with Si Racha, Laem Chabang, and Chonburi. Pattaya is at the center of the Pattaya-Chonburi Metropolitan Area—a conurbation in Chonburi Province—with a population of roughly 1,000,000.

History 

The name Pattaya evolved from the march of Phraya Tak (later King Taksin) and his army from Ayutthaya to Chanthaburi, which took place before the fall of the former capital to Burmese invaders in 1767. When his army arrived in the vicinity of what is now Pattaya, Phraya Tak encountered the troops of a local leader named Nai Klom, who tried to intercept him. When the two met face to face, Nai Klom was impressed by Phraya Tak's dignified manner and his army's strict discipline. He surrendered without a fight and joined his forces. The place the armies confronted each other was thereafter known as "Thap Phraya", which means the "army of the Phraya". This later became Pattaya, the name of the wind blowing from the south-west to the north-east at the beginning of the rainy season.

Pattaya was a fishing village until the 1960s. Tourism began during the Vietnam War, when American servicemen began arriving on R&R (rest and relaxation). One large group who arrived from a base in Korat on 29 June 1959 and rented houses from Phraya Sunthorn at the south end of the beach, on what is now known as the "Strip", are credited with recommending Pattaya, whose fame spread by word of mouth.

Climate 
Pattaya has a tropical wet and dry climate, which is divided into the following seasons: hot and dry (December to February), hot and humid (March and April), and hot and rainy (May to November).

Demographics 

The city (mueang) had 320,262 people resident and counted on census 2010 (National Statistics Office). Most of these people counted are Thai, with most migrant populations not recognized, although the details are quite complex as there are even indigenous Thais without nationality, and migrant workers have since been largely regularized (albeit with due foreign pressure).  Therefore, the census population does not represent the total figure.  As for Thai nationals and legal permanent residents (very few) registering the city as their hometown, the provincial authority logged population was 107,944 in 2010, modestly rising to 119,530 by 2019. As with the Bangkok Metropolitan Region, registered population figure issued by a different agency than the National Statistics Office hardly captures the scope of the urban transformation that has occurred over the time span – the economy is dependent on the large numbers of casual Thai workers who work in the city yet remain registered in their hometowns, there is much employment turnover and to and from the capital, as well as seasonal farm migration.  Migrant workers from neighboring nations, and many long-term expatriates who reside in the city as retirees or self-employed or contracted are traditionally not counted.  There has never been a reliably published figure for total population, but its thought to be quite large (on the order of half a million people) given the ubiquity and sheer number of migrant workers taking place of Thai labor.  Pattaya city excludes some nearby areas like Nong Prue (73,901 people in 2010 census) and Huay Yai.

Pattaya additionally has massive population inflow from short stay tourism, with its 2000 hotels and 136,000 rooms available as of 2015.

A growing community of foreign retirees live in Pattaya. Thailand immigration has a special visa category for foreigners over age 50 who wish to retire in Thailand. Pattaya is attractive to many retirees from other countries not only because of its climate and lifestyle, but also because living costs are lower than in many countries.

It also has a large Indian community which mainly speaks Tamil.

Physical geography 

The city of Pattaya is a special municipal area which covers the whole tambon Nong Prue (Nongprue) and Na Kluea (Naklua) and parts of Huai Yai and Nong Pla Lai.  Bang Lamung township which forms the northern border of Pattaya covers parts of the tambon Bang Lamung (Banglamung), Nong Pla Lai and Takhian Tia. Bang Sare (Bang Saray) is on the southern border of Pattaya.

"Greater Pattaya" occupies most of the coastline of Banglamung (one of the eleven districts that make up Chonburi Province). It is divided into a larger northern section which spans the areas to the east of Naklua Beach (the most northern beach) and Pattaya Beach (the main beach) plus Phra Tamnak Hill (often called "Buddha Hill" because of the temples on top of the hill) headland immediately south of Pattaya Beach, and a smaller southern section covering the area to the east of Jomtien Beach (directly south of Phra Tamnak Hill).

Beaches and islands 

The main sweep of the bay area is divided into two principal beachfronts. Pattaya Beach lies parallel to the city centre, and runs about 2.7 km long from Pattaya Nuea (North) south along the coast to Pattaya Tai (South) which is the entrance to Walking Street.  The beach, which used to be 35 m wide, suffers from erosion and in some places was reduced to a width of only two to three meters. A 429 million baht beach restoration scheme was implemented in 2018. It will take 360,000 m3 of sand from Ko Rang Kwian offshore to increase the beach width to 50 m. Without intervention Pattaya will likely see its beaches disappear in roughly ten years according to Chulalongkorn University researchers. Within a month of the completion of the restoration of the first 400 m of Pattaya Beach, the work was "seriously damaged" by flooding. The beach is the first in the country to use imported sand to compensate for coastal erosion. An official said, "...the longer it is left without the flood damage being repaired, the worse it will get."

Phra Tamnak Hill is on the south side of Pattaya and is popular for its viewpoints and the temple (Wat Phra Yai) on top of the hill. Pattaya Park and Pattaya tower are at the south end of Phra Tamnak Hill and the Pattaya Exhibition And Convention Hall (P.E.A.C.H), is positioned at the north end of Phra Tamnak Hill. In recent years, Phra Tamnak Hill has gained in popularity because of its more natural environment, nicer beaches, and its convenient location between Jomtien and Pattaya city.

Jomtien is divided from Pattaya by Thepprasit Road, the southern route into Pattaya city. It consists of high-rise condominiums, beach side hotels, bungalow complexes, shops, bars, and restaurants.

Offshore islands include three "near islands": Ko Lan (main island), Ko Sak, and Ko Krok,  from the shore of Pattaya. The "far islands" are Ko Phai (main island), Ko Man Wichai, Ko Hu Chang and Ko Klung Badan, located offshore further west of the "near islands". Ko Rin lies offshore to the south-west, south of Ko Phai group. The names  "near islands", "far islands", and "Coral Island" are used for marketing purposes only and do not correspond to any naming conventions of the island groups and are not shown on maritime charts published by the Hydrographic Service of the Royal Thai Navy.

In June 2016 the Regional Environmental Office reported that, "The sea water along the busy central Pattaya beaches is of poor quality and could endanger human and marine life."

Environment

Pattaya produces on the order of 450 tonnes of solid waste per day. The city spends more than 300 million baht on waste removal and disposal annually. On average it pays 1,600 baht to process each tonne of garbage. Significant volumes of rubbish are allegedly dumped into the sea by tour boats.

In July 2017 Pattaya Beach was fouled for a week by raw sewage that poured out of a storm drain. City officials blamed the incident on broken pumps and Pattaya's poorly maintained sewage-treatment plant. The environmental ministry declared it would step up enforcement of pollution laws and push Pattaya for better wastewater-treatment efficiency. According to the ministry, Pattaya has 1,047 identified sources of sewage and garbage pollution, the number increasing as the city grows. The sea water along central Pattaya beaches is of poor quality even in the absence of sewage spills and "could endanger human and marine life", the regional environmental office has said. They deemed sea water quality near central Pattaya beaches as "poor" and deteriorating. They judged water quality near Na Klua in North Pattaya, South Pattaya, Ko Lan, and Jomtien Beach as "fairly good". The city has considered expanding two water management plants to increase capacity for better treatment of wastewater prior to discharge into the ocean. The water treatment plant in Soi Wat Nongyai after expansion would be able to treat around 130,000 cubic metres of waste water a day, up from 80,000 cubic metres at present. The expansion was never implemented.

In November 2018, the Pattaya City Council approved 188 million baht for the repair of its six wastewater treatment plants. Installed in 2000, the plants can accommodate 65,000 m3 of wastewater per day. More than a third of plant equipment was found to be 40–50 percent worn out. The system treats waste from a 36 km2 portion of Pattaya, or 68 percent of its urban area. Earlier plans to increase treatment capacity to 135,000 m3 were never implemented and existing plants were allowed to fall into disrepair. Pattaya uses more than 200,000 m3 of water a day, but claims to only discharge about 70,000 m3 a day. The discrepancy is unexplained. Once treated, there are no tests to measure water quality before it is dumped back into the sea, which may account for foul water discharges.

Economy

Pattaya is at the center of Thailand's Eastern Economic Corridor (EEC). Investments totaling more than 1.5 trillion baht (US$45 billion) are flowing into EEC infrastructure projects: airports, deep-sea ports, high-speed railways, autoroutes. The result will enhance Pattaya's accessibility. According to the Thai Chamber of Commerce (TCC) the EEC investments, the U-Tapao International Airport and the high-speed train that will link three major airports to Pattaya, will make Pattaya the heart of the eastern region. The TCC view is that, "Plenty of attractions...will lure lots more foreign and domestic tourists in the future." Better connectivity will reduce both the cost and time to travel to Pattaya, with the TCC estimating the number of tourists visiting the EEC region to rise to 46.7 million over the next few years, one and half times the current 29.8 million visitors. Pattaya projects include developing a tram in the city and building a bigger cruise terminal, as well as new tourist attractions: a water park, an ice dome, cultural markets, Thai boxing gyms, theaters, and conference halls. All are under development. "We aimed to get rid of the previous [seedy] image of Pattaya and try to promote a new image to show that Pattaya is a place for everyone with diversity of new tourist attractions," said an official of the Tourism Authority of Thailand (TAT). He said that the EEC would make Pattaya more competitive compared with other popular Thai beach destinations such as Phuket and Ko Samui, with cheaper transport costs.

Fourteen million visitors in 2018 contributed 239 billion baht to the city's treasury. That represents more than 70% of Pattaya's total income for the year. The city's leadership plans to reduce Pattaya's reliance on tourism to 60% by 2025 by transforming itself into "Neo Pattaya", an international business center. Key to the plans are infrastructure improvements: 9.5 billion baht for flood management projects and upgrading sewage treatment plants to handle 130,000 m3 of waste per day, up from 67,000 m3 per day in 2019.

Transportation 

Road
Via the Bangkok-Chonburi-Pattaya Motorway (Hwy 7). The motorway is linked with Bangkok's Outer Ring Road (Hwy 9) and there is also another entrance at Si Nakharin and Rama IX Junction.
Via Bang Na-Trat Highway (Hwy 34). From Bang Na, Bang Phli, across the Bang Pakong River to Chonburi there is a Chonburi bypass that meets Sukhumvit Road (Hwy 3), passing Bang Saen Beach, Bang Phra to Pattaya.

Notable roads
 Pattaya 1 Road (Beach Road) runs along the beach.
 Pattaya 2 Road (Second Road) runs approximately 400 metres inland, parallel to Pattaya 1 Road.
 Pattaya 3 Road (Third Road): this is Pattaya's outer-ring road which connects north, south, and central Pattaya.
 Pattaya Tai (South Pattaya Road) runs from Beach Road to Sukhumvit Highway.
 Pattaya Klang (Central Pattaya Road) runs from Beach Road to Sukhumvit Highway.
 Pattaya Nuea (North Pattaya Road) runs from Beach Road to Sukhumvit Highway.
 Tappraya Road connects Pattaya 2 to Jomtien Beach Road.
 Thepprasit Road connects Tappraya Road to Sukhumvit Highway.
 Soi Buakaow connects Pattaya Tai and Pattaya Klang, between Pattaya 2 Road and Pattaya 3 Road.

Rail
A daily service operates on the Eastern Line of the State Railway of Thailand between Pattaya and Hualumphong Station in Bangkok.

Bus
Pattaya is served by bus services from Bangkok's Northern Bus Terminal (Mo Chit) and the Eastern Bus Terminal (Ekamai), connecting to Pattaya's main bus terminal on Pattaya Nuea (North Pattaya Road) near Sukhumvit Road.

There are two airport bus services.
The 389 Bus (airportpattayabus) service connects Pattaya with Suvarnabhumi Airport (BKK). It uses modern, air-conditioned buses, and takes around  hours to reach the airport. The trip from the airport (Level 1 Gate 8 at the Arrival Hall) to the bus terminal in Pattaya, makes three stops at North, Central, and South Pattaya intersections before going to their last drop off point, the office on Thappraya Road (near Jomtien). It can take longer if many hotel stops are negotiated along Sukhumvit Road in Pattaya. The other bus service is the Bell Travel Service (Coach 36) which goes from the airport (Level 1 between Gate 7 & 8) to the Pattaya Bell office at the North Pattaya Intersection, and then provides transfers to local hotels.

Buses from a terminal on Sukhumvit Road near Pattaya Klang (near the Central Pattaya intersection) connect Pattaya with many destinations in the north-east region (i.e. Isan).

City and suburban services are mainly provided by songthaew, popularly nicknamed "baht buses" or "blue taxis".

Air
By road, it is accessed from Sukhumvit Road and Motorway 7 from Bangkok. Pattaya is also served by scheduled flights via U-Tapao International Airport (UTP) which is 45-minute drive south of the city.

Boat
A passenger-only ferry service from Pattaya to Hua Hin began operation on 12 January 2017 and is operated by Royal Passenger Liner. By road, the journey takes five to six hours. The ferry shortens travel time to about two hours, subject to sea conditions. The ferry cruises at 27 knots on the 113 km journey across the Gulf of Thailand with a maximum passenger capacity of 150 persons. Larger ferries carrying up to 260 people may be added to the service later. Ferries capable of carrying vehicles are projected for 2020. In November 2018, Hua Hin deputy chief Chareewat Phramanee confirmed the ferry service, suspended due to low tourist numbers during low season, would be up and running again for high season between Hua Hin and Pattaya, a 2.5-hour journey for 1,250 baht on a catamaran with a maximum capacity of 340.

Administration

Pattaya city has been administered under a special autonomous system since 30 October 1978.  It has a status comparable to a municipality and is separately administered by the mayor of Pattaya city who is responsible for making policies, organising public services, and supervising the city's workforce for an area that covers 53.4 square kilometers and consists of four subdistricts, 18 villages (muban).

Tourism 

Once a fishing town, Pattaya first boomed as an R&R destination for US servicemen stationed at nearby former USAF base at U-Tapao, or other US bases in Thailand during the Vietnam War. In 2018, Pattaya was the 18th most visited city in the world with 9.6 million tourists, and 3rd most in Thailand, after Bangkok (24.1 million) and Phuket (10.5 million).

Festivals 

 Chinese New Year (varies from late January to early February) is celebrated by Pattaya's large Thai-Chinese community with dragons parades, lion dances, and fireworks.
 Pattaya International Music Festival is held annually in the month of March. It attracts huge crowds to the different stages along Beach Road and Bali Hai Pier, and presents several styles of music performed by Thai and international artists.
 The Pattaya Songkran festival, locally called Wan Lai, takes place each year in mid-April. It differs from most other Songkran festivals of Thailand in several aspects. It lasts several days longer and, besides water fights, the event includes beauty pageants, musical performances, cultural shows, fireworks, and water sports competitions.
 Top of the Gulf Regatta is a week-long sailing event held at the end of April, beginning of May.
 The Miss Tiffany Universe beauty pageant is held mid-May each year. During the four-day pageant, Thailand's most beautiful transgender persons and transsexuals vie for first place with the final evening broadcast live on Thai TV for an audience of, on average, 15 million.
 Pattaya Marathon, featuring several race categories, is held each year in July.
 Pattaya Classical Guitar Festival, held annually on the last weekend of October, organized by the Thailand Guitar Society, Pattaya People Media Group, and Siam Bayshore Pattaya.
 Loi Krathong, a light festival held during the full moon of the twelfth month in the traditional Thai lunar calendar and which usually falls in November, is celebrated in Pattaya, as in the rest of the country, that evening with people floating krathongs (small, candle-lit floats made from elaborately folded banana leaves) on the waters, as well as releasing khom loi (candle-fired hot air balloons) into the night sky.
 Every November Pattaya hosts Miss International Queen, a yearly international pageant for transgender persons and transsexuals. In 2007 the event drew an estimated 25 million viewers on national TV.

Nightlife 

Pattaya has derived part of its reputation as a tourist destination due to the sex industry and the resulting nightlife, and this notoriety has influenced the city's evolution in many ways. Prostitution in Thailand is technically illegal but tolerated in most cities, including Pattaya. The city's vast numbers of host bars, gogo bars, massage parlours, saunas, and hourly hotels, serve foreign tourists as well as locals. This is especially prominent on Walking Street as well as other areas around the city. Efforts have been made to clean up the city's image.

An article in the British tabloid the Daily Mirror have described Pattaya as "the world's sex capital", a "modern-day Sodom and Gomorrah". This provoked anger from government officials as high up as Prime Minister Prayut Chan-o-cha. Pol Col Apichai Krobpetch, the Pattaya police superintendent, denied that Pattaya is a sex trade paradise. Upset about the British media's stories, he insisted they were fabricated. "There is no such thing as prostitution in Pattaya," said Col Apichai. "Where did they get the figure of 27,000 sex workers in Pattaya? Anyone can make up this information....Thai ladies having sex with foreigners is their personal issue. If they like each other, I don't see anything wrong with what they do behind closed doors." In response, Pattaya social worker Surang Janyam, the director of Service Workers IN Group Foundation, said that estimated number of Pattaya prostitutes published in the Daily Mirror is inaccurate: "27,000 sex workers in Pattaya is way too low. We have a lot more sex workers than that." In June 2019, over twenty high ranking Police, Army and Local government officers toured Pattaya and reported the central streets safe and free from illegal activities.

As evidence of the government's commitment to clean up Pattaya, on 26 February 2017 at 20:00, 60 police officers and soldiers raided Pattaya's notorious Soi 6 to check for violations of the law. When the checks were completed, police announced that all licenses were in order and there was no law breaking of any kind, including prostitution, taking place there.

Pattaya also has Asia's largest gay scene based around Boyztown, the Jomtien Complex, and Sunee Plaza. The city is also famous for its flamboyant kathoey cabaret shows where transsexual and transgender entertainers perform to packed houses.

Crime
In recent years, Pattaya has served as a hideaway for foreigners with connections to organized crime in their home countries, and dozens have been murdered in gang-related disputes.

People who visit the Pattaya area may encounter petty crime, usually limited to pickpocketing and confidence tricks, particularly in and around major tourist areas such as Jomtien and Pattaya Beaches and on the "baht buses". A special Tourist Police division has been established to aid tourists who are victims of crime. The 2009 British eight-episode TV documentary Big Trouble in Tourist Thailand described crimes involving tourists in Pattaya.

On 11 April 2009, Thailand's Prime Minister Abhisit Vejjajiva declared a state of emergency in the areas of Pattaya and Chonburi, in response to Red Shirt anti-government protesters breaking into the conference center of the Royal Cliff Beach Resort hotel complex, the site of an ASEAN Summit. The meeting was immediately cancelled and Asian leaders were evacuated, some by helicopter.

Law
In 2019 the International Thai Foundation ('ITF') established a Community Legal Centre in Soi Bua Kao, Pattaya. Its objectives are to promote education, protect human rights & relieve poverty for the people in Thailand. This is the third CLC in Thailand 
Pro Bono Community Hub in Chiang Mai

Media and communications 
Several local foreign-language newspapers and magazines are published either weekly or monthly, especially in English, Russian, and German. The English-language newspapers include the Pattaya Mail and Pattaya People. The Pattaya News is an online portal that writes the local news in six languages. DER FARANG is a German-language newspaper published every 14 days. Thailands Tidende is a Norwegian-language newspaper published monthly.

In popular media 
The novel Platform by French author Michel Houellebecq prominently features the city of Pattaya as well as its nightlife.

Education

International schools in Pattaya:
 École francophone de Pattaya
 International School of Chonburi
 Tara Pattana International School
 Rugby School Thailand
 Mooltripakdee International School Pattaya
 Hastin International School
The Thai-Japanese Association School Sriracha, a Japanese international school, is in nearby Si Racha. It is an affiliate of the Thai-Japanese Association School in Bangkok. Si Racha formerly housed the Sriracha-Pattaya Japanese Supplement School, a Japanese weekend school.

Twin towns and sister cities

Pattaya has agreements with the following sister cities

 Shymkent, Kazakhstan (June 2017)
 Saint Petersburg, Russia (June 2017)
 Qingdao, China (2013)
 Hubei, China (2014)
 Zhangjiajie, China (2016)

See also 
 Wong Amat
 Walking Street, Pattaya
 Phra Tamnak Hill
 Jomtien Beach

References

External links 

 Thailand's Sin City Reaches for Respectability – slideshow by The New York Times

 
Beaches of Thailand
Gulf of Thailand
Populated places in Chonburi province
Articles containing video clips